Deadlight or Deadlights may refer to:

Boats 
Deadlight, a wood or metal shutter fastened over a ship's porthole or cabin window in stormy weather
Deadlight, less common term for a deck prism, a porthole fixed in a ship's deck to give natural light to a hold or cabin below deck
 Operation Deadlight, a 1946 UK naval operation to scuttle German U-boats following the end of WWII

Books
 Deadlight, first paranormal SF novel of Scottish novelist Archie Roy 1968
 Deadlights, in the works of Stephen King such as It (novel)

Music
 Deadlight (album), a 2007 album by Finnish band Before the Dawn
 Deadlights (American band), 1998–2000

 Deadlights (EP), a 1996 EP by Norwegian band Gehenna
 "Deadlight", a song by Draconian from the 2011 album A Rose for the Apocalypse

Video games 

 Deadlight (video game), a 2012 video game